Jared Downing (born July 12, 1989) is an American mixed martial artist. A professional since 2009, he has fought in Bellator, Shark Fights, and the Resurrection Fighting Alliance.

Mixed martial arts career

Early career
Downing started his professional career in 2009. Until October 2011, he fought for many promotions throughout the United States, most notably Bellator and Shark Fights.

For Bellator, he faced Chad Vandenberg and Danny Tims. Downing defeated Vandenberg via submission in the third round, and defeated Tims via split decision (30-27 Downing, 29-28 Tims, 30-27 Downing).

For Shark Fights, he faced Ran Weathers and Roberto Vargas. Downing defeated Weathers by knockout early in the first round, but against Vargas, he had his first defeat via split decision (30-27 Vargas, 30-27 Vargas, 30-27 Downing).

Resurrection Fighting Alliance
Downing fought in the first two events of Resurrection Fighting Alliance. He defeated Eric Marriott at RFA 1: Elliott vs. Pulver and Alessandro Ferreira at RFA 2: Yvel vs. Alexander, both via unanimous decision.

Downing faced Jordan Rinaldi on November 30, 2012 at RFA 5: Downing vs. Rinaldi. He defeated Rinaldi in a five-round bout via unanimous decision to become the promotion's first-ever featherweight champion.

Downing faced Lance Palmer on June 21, 2013 at RFA 8: Pettis vs. Pegg in his first title defense. Downing lost his title via split decision after five rounds (48-46 Downing, 48-46 Palmer, 48-46 Palmer).

Second Bellator run
After some years away from the promotion, Downing was called to replace an injured Rob Emerson against Patricio Freire on July 31, 2013 at Bellator 97. He was defeated via TKO in the second round.

Downing faced The Ultimate Fighter 5 competitor Rob Emerson on October 18, 2013 at Bellator 104. He lost via submission early in the first round.

Championships and accomplishments

Mixed martial arts
Resurrection Fighting Alliance
RFA Featherweight Championship (One time; inaugural)

Mixed martial arts record

| Win
| align=center| 10-6
| Jay Ellis
| Submission (guillotine choke)
| Elite Fight League 4
| 
| align=center| 1
| align=center| 2:18
| Cedar Rapids, Iowa, United States
|Welterweight debut.
|-
| Loss
| align=center| 9–6
| Eric Wisely
| Decision (split)
| PC MMA: Pinnacle Combat 19
| 
| align=center| 3
| align=center| 5:00
| Cedar Rapids, Iowa, United States
|For the Pinnacle Combat Lightweight Championship.
|-
| Loss
| align=center| 9–5
| Martin Brown
| Decision (unanimous)
| Bellator 117
| 
| align=center| 3
| align=center| 5:00
| Council Bluffs, Iowa, United States
|Lightweight debut.
|-
| Loss
| align=center| 9–4
| Rob Emerson
| Submission (inverted heel hook)
| Bellator 104
| 
| align=center| 1
| align=center| 1:44
| Cedar Rapids, Iowa, United States
| 
|-
| Loss
| align=center| 9–3
| Patricio Freire
| TKO (punches)
| Bellator 97
| 
| align=center| 2
| align=center| 0:54
| Rio Rancho, New Mexico, United States
| 
|-
| Loss
| align=center| 9–2
| Lance Palmer
| Decision (split)
| Resurrection Fighting Alliance 8: Pettis vs. Pegg
| 
| align=center| 5
| align=center| 5:00
| Milwaukee, Wisconsin, United States
| 
|-
| Win
| align=center| 9–1
| Jordan Rinaldi
| Decision (unanimous)
| Resurrection Fighting Alliance 5: Downing vs. Rinaldi
| 
| align=center| 5
| align=center| 5:00
| Kearney, Nebraska, United States
| 
|-
| Win
| align=center| 8–1
| Alessandro Ferreira
| Decision (unanimous)
| Resurrection Fighting Alliance 2: Yvel vs. Alexander
| 
| align=center| 3
| align=center| 5:00
| Kearney, Nebraska, United States
| 
|-
| Win
| align=center| 7–1
| Eric Marriott
| Decision (unanimous)
| Resurrection Fighting Alliance 1: Elliott vs. Pulver
| 
| align=center| 3
| align=center| 5:00
| Kearney, Nebraska, United States
| 
|-
| Loss
| align=center| 6–1
| Roberto Vargas
| Decision (split)
| Shark Fights 20
| 
| align=center| 3
| align=center| 5:00
| Laughlin, Nevada, United States
| 
|-
| Win
| align=center| 6–0
| Ran Weathers
| KO (punches)
| Shark Fights 16: Neer vs. Juarez
| 
| align=center| 1
| align=center| 1:38
| Odessa, Texas, United States
| 
|-
| Win
| align=center| 5–0
| Danny Tims
| Decision (split)
| Bellator 32
| 
| align=center| 3
| align=center| 5:00
| Kansas City, Missouri, United States
| 
|-
| Win
| align=center| 4–0
| William Joplin
| Decision (unanimous)
| CFFAC 2: Tribute to America's Heroes
| 
| align=center| 3
| align=center| 5:00
| Kansas City, Kansas, United States
| 
|-
| Win
| align=center| 3–0
| Chad Vandenberg
| Submission (rear-naked choke)
| Bellator 22
| 
| align=center| 3
| align=center| 1:35
| Kansas City, Missouri, United States
| 
|-
| Win
| align=center| 2–0
| Ramiro Hernandez
| Decision (unanimous)
| Pinnacle Combat MMA 4
| 
| align=center| 3
| align=center| 5:00
| Dubuque, Iowa, United States
| 
|-
| Win
| align=center| 1–0
| Tim Gorman
| Decision (split)
| MFDM: Ballroom Brawl 3
| 
| align=center| 3
| align=center| 5:00
| Des Moines, Iowa, United States
|

Mixed martial arts amateur record

|-
| Win
| align=center| 3–0
| Nick Quangvan
| Submission (armbar)
| RCC 10: Devil's Fights
| 
| align=center| 1
| align=center| 2:12
| Iowa City, Iowa, United States
| 
|-
| Win
| align=center| 2–0
| R.J. Harrison
| TKO (punches)
| Glory Fighting Championships 8
| 
| align=center| 2
| align=center| 1:37
| Des Moines, Iowa, United States
| 
|-
| Win
| align=center| 1–0
| Patrick Osborn
| TKO (punches)
| Glory Fighting Championships 7
| 
| align=center| 1
| align=center| N/A
| Des Moines, Iowa, United States
|

References

1989 births
Living people
Sportspeople from Cedar Rapids, Iowa
American male mixed martial artists
Mixed martial artists from Iowa
Featherweight mixed martial artists